Enicodini is a tribe of longhorn beetles of the subfamily Lamiinae. It was described by Thomson in 1860.

Taxonomy
 Anomonotes Heller, 1917
 Cephalenicodes Breuning, 1953
 Clavenicodes Breuning, 1953
 Dicra Fauvel, 1906
 Enicodes Thomson, 1860
 Enotes Thomson, 1864
 Enotogenes Heller, 1917
 Enotoschema Breuning, 1953
 Falsenicodes Breuning, 1940
 Granulenotes Breuning, 1969
 Leptaschema Breuning, 1953
 Leptenicodes Breuning, 1953
 Leptonota Thomson, 1860
 Lepturonota Breuning, 1953
 Lepturoschema Heller, 1916
 Mimenicodes Breuning, 1940
 Nemaschema Thomson, 1860
 Otenis Heller, 1917
 Paraenicodes 
 Pulchrenicodes Breuning, 1953
 Scabroschema Breuning, 1953
 Toxotomimus Heller, 1917

References

 
Lamiinae